Conine may refer to the following.

People
 Griffin Conine (born 1997), American professional baseball player
Jeff Conine (born 1966), former Major league Baseball player
Steve Conine, American billionaire businessman

Places
Lake Conine, freshwater lake in Winter Haven, Florida
Conine's Clubhouse Grill, a grill owned by Jeff Conine

Other
 Conine or coniine, a poisonous alkaloid found in poison hemlock
 Conine, an Irish clan